Jose Philip D'Souza is an Indian politician and member of the Nationalist Congress Party. D'Souza was a member of the Goa Legislative Assembly from the Vasco constituency in South Goa.

References 

People from Vasco da Gama, Goa
Members of the Goa Legislative Assembly
Living people
21st-century Indian politicians
Nationalist Congress Party politicians from Goa
Year of birth missing (living people)
United Goans Democratic Party politicians